Pervomayskoye is a rural locality (a selo) in Krinichanskoye Rural Settlement, Rossoshansky District, Voronezh Oblast, Russia. The population was 462 as of 2010. There are 14 streets.

Geography 
Pervomayskoye is located 54 km northeast of Rossosh (the district's administrative centre) by road. Ivanovka is the nearest rural locality.

References 

Rural localities in Rossoshansky District